Dibaya-Lubwe (or Dibaya Lubue, Lubue) is a town in the Kwilu Province of the Democratic Republic of the Congo.
It is in Idiofa Territory. The town lies on the south shore of the Kasai River just below the point where it is joined by the Lubue River.
As of 2012 the population was estimated to be 38,933.

The town, lying in eastern Ding territory.  The first European to it was the German explorer Hermann von Wissmann in June 1885.
It became the site for palm oil processing, and was granted the status of a "centre extra-coutumier".
By 1931 the town had grown into a commercial center.

References

Sources

Populated places in Kwilu Province